Brian Scolaro (born October 18, 1973) is an American comedian and actor. He is most known for his half-hour special on Comedy Central and his roles on FOX's Stacked, TBS's Sullivan & Son and NBC's Three Sisters.

Early life 
Brian Scolaro was born October 18, 1973 in Bay Ridge, Brooklyn and went to Archbishop Molloy High School in Jamaica, Queens where he appeared as a lead in the school's theatre productions of No Time for Sergeants, Room Service, 12 Angry Men and Arsenic and Old Lace. At the State University of New Paltz, New York, Scolaro wrote, produced and hosted a radio comedy program That Damn Show on WFNP FM for three years and became the hero of neighboring high school kids in the Mid-Hudson Valley. Along with his friend Brett Bisogno, Scolaro wrote, produced and starred in the college's television comedy show Earp and Whitney which was nominated for a National Association of College Broadcaster's award for Best Comedy Program in 1995.

After graduating college, Scolaro worked with the mentally handicapped in Brooklyn, and as a brief stint as a production assistant for HBO Downtown Productions, The Comedy Channel (now Comedy Central) and HBO's "Reel Sex". Scolaro quit his assistant job and turned to stand-up comedy full-time and did his first stand-up show at Stand Up NY in Manhattan on January 14, 1992.

He established himself as a stand-up comedian in Manhattan at Gotham Comedy Club, Caroline's Comedy Club, Stand Up NY, Dangerfields, Comic Strip Live, Boston Comedy Club, Catch a Rising Star and The Comedy Cellar on Macdougal Street in Greenwich Village. He appeared in Montreal's Just For Laughs Comedy Festival in 1999.

His early professional acting career was highlighted by three Wendy's commercials and a guest role on Sidney Lumet's "100 Centre St."

Career 
In 2001, writer Steve Koren (Saturday Night Live, Seinfeld) saw Scolaro at the end of 12-hour video tape collage of actors auditioning for his NBC pilot Everything but the Girl with Tiffani Amber Thiessen. Koren insisted NBC fly Scolaro in to test and he was hired as a regular cast member for the role of love sick, overly sensitive "Doug". When the pilot was beat to the line-up by Scrubs, Lester Lewis (The Office) brought him to the attention of Eileen Heisler and DeAnn Heline (The Middle) and he immediately moved to Hollywood to be a regular cast member on the second season of NBC's Three Sisters as the bartender named Gordon, love interest of A. J. Langer.

In 2003, Scolaro appeared as a regular cast member on a popular ABC pilot by director Tom Shadyack called Platonically Incorrect with Tom Everett Scott. The pilot was penned by Darlene Hunt, Gabe Sax and Jeff Judah and even shot a second episode but still did not get picked up by ABC after a long deliberation.

After a holding deal with CBS in 2004, Scolaro was cast as Stuart Miller for Fox's Stacked which starred Pamela Anderson and Christopher Lloyd. Written by Steve Levitan, Stacked was a pilot that was guaranteed to air six episodes in 2005 and the following year aired a full second season. Paul Brownfield from the Los Angeles Times said "Scolaro is terrific. An actual sitcom find."

During the writer's strike of 2007-2008, Scolaro did stand-up performances on NBC's Late Nite with Conan O'Brien and was invited back to the channel that started his career as an intern, Comedy Central, to headline an episode of Live at Gotham. In 2009, he taped his own half-hour special for the network Comedy Central Presents: Brian Scolaro.

From 2008 to 2023, Scolaro has had a recurring characters on several series; the sad sack, forgetful, Doug, on TBS's Sullivan and Son, Brian the negative but competent lawyer on ABC's A Million Little Things, the ridiculous Uncle Bill on "Ten Year Old Tom", the paranormal police man Goblin on Disney's "Wizards of Waverly Place" and played numerous characters on HBO's The Life and Times of Tim and Comedy Central's "Kroll Show". 

He also did stand-up on The Late Late Show with Craig Ferguson, "Comics Unleashed", "Gotham Comedy Live", and Conan, and appeared on ABC's "Abbott Elementary", AMC's Mad Men, Showtime's Shameless, NBC's "Night Court", TNT's Men of a Certain Age, Showtime's Dexter, ABC's Grey's Anatomy, FOX's Bones, ABC's The Middle, Disney's Girl Meets World, NBC's Go On, ABC's Castle, Showtime's I'm Dying Up Here, NBC's Harry's Law, CBS's Superior Donuts, Freeform's Alone Together, NBC's Truth Be Told, Disney's Crash and Bernstein, the film The Brothers Solomon, as well as commercials for Snapple and the famous jewelry/teddy bear heist ad for Netflix.

Television work 
 
 Night Court (Arnold)
 Ten Year Old Tom (Uncle Bill; voice)
 Abbott Elementary (Vinny)
 A Million Little Things (Brian)
 Shameless (Baxter)
 Alone Together (Mark)
 I'm Dying Up Here (Buzz)
 Superior Donuts (Scalper)
 Girl Meets World (Mr. Fannucci)
 Castle (Dave Barton)
 Conan (himself)
 Truth Be Told (Vincent)
 Bones (Frankie Cesari)
 The Middle (Mickey)
 Crash & Bernstein (Jimmy)
 Growing Up Fisher (Guard)
 Kroll Show (Sergio)
 Go On (Gambler)
 Sullivan & Son (Doug)
 Mad Men (Alex Polito)
 Grey's Anatomy (Mike)
 Late Late Show with Craig Ferguson (himself)
 Harry's Law (Father Damien)
 Men of a Certain Age (City Clerk)
 The Life & Times of Tim (Various Voices)
 Wizards of Waverly Place (Goblin)
 100 Centre Street (Byron White)
 Everything But The Girl - NBC pilot- Todd
 Platonically Incorrect- ABC Pilot- Bob Snellen
 Three Sisters (Gordon)
 Stacked (Stuart Miller)
 Dexter (Lab Tech)
 One on One (Torian)
 Greetings from Tucson (Larry Janetti)
 All of Us (Torian)
 Coupling (Paul)
 Comedy Central Presents himself
 Late Night with Conan O'Brien himself
 Live at Gotham himself
 Comics Unleashed himself

Film work 
 Blowing Smoke  (Nick)
 The Brothers Solomon (Medical Equipment Delivery Guy)

Videogame work 
 Grand Theft Auto V (The Local Population)
 Need for Speed: Carbon (Neville)

Commercial work 
 
 Snapple (Mango)
 Netflix (Lead)
 Wendy's (Lead in 3 spots)

Albums 

 Sneezes, Farts and Orgasms 
 Brian Scolaro: Live at the Comedy Castle 
 Stupid Time: A Sketch Album 
 Then and Now

Books 

 How to Punch a Monkey

References

External links 
 Official website
 

1973 births
Living people
21st-century American comedians
Archbishop Molloy High School alumni
American male comedians
American male film actors
American male television actors
American male voice actors
Comedians from California
Comedians from New York (state)
Male actors from Los Angeles
Male actors from New York (state)
People from Bay Ridge, Brooklyn